Greg Lee Barton (July 14, 1946—August 26, 2019) was a former American football quarterback in the National Football League who played for the Detroit Lions. He was traded from the Lions to the Philadelphia Eagles for a 1971 second-round selection (30th overall–Dave Thompson) and 1972 second- and third-round picks (40th and 65th overall–to Atlanta Falcons and Ken Sanders respectively) on January 28, 1971. He played college football for the Tulsa Golden Hurricane. He also played in the Canadian Football League for the Toronto Argonauts and in the World Football League for the Portland Storm.

References

1946 births
Living people
Players of American football from Denver
American football quarterbacks
Canadian football quarterbacks
Detroit Lions players
Toronto Argonauts players
Portland Storm players
Tulsa Golden Hurricane football players